Yanagi-ba-bōchō (柳刃包丁, literally willow blade knife), yanagi ba, or yanagi, is a long and thin knife used in the Japanese cuisine. It is the typical example of the sashimi bōchō (Japanese: 刺身包丁, sashimi [raw fish] bōchō [knife]) used to slice fish for sashimi and nigiri sushi.

When preparing sashimi and nigiri sushi, the goal is usually to have cut surfaces that are smooth, shiny, and even in order to maximize the taste. The construction of a yanagi ba is designed for this purpose.

 Length: The long blade allows the user to cut a block of flesh in a single stroke. This prevents zigzag cutting, which creates a serrated cross section.
 Thinness: The blade is very thin behind the edge which allows the cut to be made using primarily the weight of the knife. Greater force or thickness would result in tearing or bruising of the flesh.
 Nonstick properties: The back face (urasuki) is concave to easily detach the blade from the substance being cut, and the front bevel (shinogi) allows sliced piece to be easily removed from the blade after cutting.
 Steel properties: The yanagi ba is crafted using techniques from those of the Japanese sword adapted to modern requirements. The blade is constructed from soft iron, which allows general toughness of the blade and ease of sharpening, laminated to high carbon steel, which allows hardness of the cutting edge and sharpness. The steel is typically Hitachi blue or white steel.
 Single ground:  For right-hand use, the yanagi ba has a bevel on the right side and is concave on the left. This allows a more acute angle compared to most double bevel knives and nonstick properties.
 Cutting direction: While almost all western knives are used to push and cut, the yanagi ba is used pull and cut instead.

The first two characteristics are particularly for yanagi-ba-bocho, and its name 'yanagi' is from long and pliant characteristics of a willow branch.  The other characteristics are shared by all knives in Japanese cuisine.
The important principle in using a yanagi ba to prepare sashimi is not cutting down but pulling with its long blade in a single motion.

See also
Japanese cutlery
List of Japanese cooking utensils

References

Japanese kitchen knives

lt:Sašimio peilis
ja:包丁#包丁の種類